The Biograph Company, also known as the American Mutoscope and Biograph Company, was a motion picture company founded in 1895 and active until 1916. It was the first company in the United States devoted entirely to film production and exhibition, and for two decades was one of the most prolific, releasing over 3000 short films and 12 feature films.
During the height of silent film as a medium, Biograph was America's most prominent film studio and one of the most respected and influential studios worldwide, only rivaled by Germany's UFA, Sweden's Svensk Filmindustri and France's Pathé. The company was home to pioneering director D. W. Griffith and such actors as Mary Pickford, Lillian Gish, and Lionel Barrymore.

Founding 

The company was started by William Kennedy Dickson, an inventor at Thomas Edison's laboratory who helped pioneer the technology of capturing moving images on film. Dickson left Edison in April 1895, joining with inventors Herman Casler, Henry Marvin and businessman Elias Koopman to incorporate the American Mutoscope Company in New Jersey on December 30, 1895. The firm manufactured the Mutoscope and made flip-card movies for it as a rival to Edison's Kinetoscope for individual "peep shows", making the company Edison's chief competitor in the nickelodeon market. In the summer of 1896 the Biograph projector was released, offering superior image quality to Edison's Vitascope projector. The company soon became a leader in the film industry, with distribution and production subsidiaries around the world, including the British Mutoscope Co. In 1899 it changed its name to the American Mutoscope and Biograph Company, and in 1908 to simply the Biograph Company.

The camera used friction feed instead of Edison's sprocket feed to guide the film to the aperture. The camera itself punched a sprocket hole on each side of the frame as the film was exposed at 30 frames per second.
A patent case victory in March 1902 allowed Biograph and other producers and distributors to use the less expensive 35 mm format without an Edison license, although Biograph did not completely phase out 68 mm production until autumn of 1903.
Biograph offered prints in both formats to exhibitors until 1905, when it discontinued the larger format.

Biograph films before 1903, were mostly "actualities," documentary film footage of actual persons, places and events, each film usually less than two minutes long, such as the one of the Empire State Express, which premiered on October 12, 1896 in New York City. The occasional narrative film, usually a comedy, was typically shot in one scene, with no editing. Spurred on by competition from Edison and British and European producers, Biograph production from 1903 onward was increasingly dominated by narratives. As the stories became more complex the films became longer, with multiple scenes to tell the story, although an individual scene was still usually presented in one shot without editing. Biograph's production of actualities ended by 1908 in favor of the narrative film.

Studio 

The company's first studio was located on the roof of 841 Broadway at 13th St. in Manhattan, known then as the Hackett Carhart Building and today as the Roosevelt Building. The set-up was similar to Thomas Edison's "Black Maria" in West Orange, New Jersey, with the studio itself being mounted on circular tracks to be able to get the best possible sunlight (as of 1988 the foundations of this machinery were still extant). The company moved in 1906 to a converted brownstone mansion at 11 East 14th Street near Union Square, a building that was razed in the 1960s. This was Biograph's first indoor studio, and the first movie studio in the world to rely exclusively on artificial light. Biograph moved again in 1913, as it entered feature-film production, to a new state-of-the-art studio on 175th Street in the Bronx.

There was the problem of the underground "duping" business, where people would illegally duplicate a copyrighted movie and then remove the title screen with the company and copyright notice and sell it to theaters. In order to make the theater audience aware that they were watching an American Biograph movie (regardless of whether it was illegally "duped" or not) the AB logo would be prominently placed in random parts of the movie.

Rise of D. W. Griffith 

Director D. W. Griffith joined Biograph in 1908 as a writer and actor, but within months became its principal director. In 1908, the company's head director Wallace McCutcheon grew ill, and his son Wallace McCutcheon Jr. took his place but was not able to make a successful film for the company. As a result of these failed productions, studio head Henry Marvin gave the position of head director to Griffith, whose first film was The Adventures of Dollie. Griffith helped establish many of the conventions of narrative film, including cross-cutting to show events occurring simultaneously in different places, the flashback, the fade-in/fade-out, the interposition of closeups within a scene, and a moderated acting style more suitable for film. Although Griffith did not invent these techniques, he made them a regular part of the film vocabulary. His prolific output—often one new film a week—and willingness to experiment in many different genres helped the company become a major commercial success. Many early movie stars were Biograph performers, including Mary Pickford, Lionel Barrymore, Lillian Gish, Dorothy Gish, Robert Harron, Arthur V. Johnson, Florence Auer, Robert G. Vignola, Owen Moore, Alan Hale Sr., Florence Lawrence, Blanche Sweet, Harry Carey, James Kirkwood Sr., Mabel Normand, Henry B. Walthall, Mae Marsh, and Dorothy Davenport. Mack Sennett honed his craft as an actor and director of comedies at Biograph. After debuting at Biograph, Mary Pickford also became a top star at the studio and would soon be known to audiences as "The Biograph Girl".

In January 1910, Griffith and Lee Dougherty with the rest of the Biograph acting company travelled to Los Angeles. While the purpose of the trip was to shoot Ramona in authentic locations, it was also to determine the suitability of the West Coast as a place for a permanent studio. The group set up a small facility at Washington Street and Grand Avenue. After this, Griffith and his players decided to go a little further north to a small village they had heard about that was friendly and had beautiful floral scenery. They decided to travel there and fell in love with this little place called Hollywood. Biograph then made the first film ever in Hollywood called In Old California, a Latino melodrama about the early days of Mexico-owned California. Griffith and the Biograph troupe filmed other short movies at various locations, then traveled back to New York. After the East Coast film community heard about Hollywood, other companies began to migrate there. Biograph's little film launched Hollywood as the future movie capital of the world. It opened a studio at Pico and Georgia streets in downtown Los Angeles (where the Los Angeles Convention Center now stands) in 1911, and sent a film crew to work there each year until 1916.

Griffith left Biograph in October 1913 after finishing Judith of Bethulia, unhappy with the company's resistance to larger budgets, feature film production or giving onscreen credit to him and the cast. With him went many of the Biograph actors, his cameraman Billy Bitzer and his production crew. As a final slight to Griffith, Biograph delayed release of Judith of Bethulia until March 1914, to avoid a profit-sharing arrangement the company had with him.

Decline 
In December 1908 Biograph joined Edison in forming the Motion Picture Patents Company in an attempt to control the industry and shut out smaller producers. The "Edison Trust," as it was nicknamed, was made up of Edison, Biograph, Essanay Studios, Kalem Company, George Kleine Productions, Lubin Studios, Georges Méliès, Pathé, Selig Studios and Vitagraph Studios, and dominated distribution through the General Film Co. The Motion Picture Patents Co. and the General Film Co. were found guilty of antitrust violation in October 1915 and dissolved.

Shielded by the Trust, Biograph had been slow to enter feature film production. It contracted with the theatrical firm of Klaw & Erlanger in 1913 to produce movie versions of the latter's plays. Its first released feature, Classmates, came out in February 1914, after 69 other American features had been released in 1912–13. Distribution was hampered by Biograph using a special perforation pattern on the Klaw & Erlanger features that was incompatible with standard projectors, forcing exhibitors to lease specialized equipment from Biograph in order to show the films. With the exodus of the studio's best actors to Griffith, Biograph was unable to develop a marketable star system as the independent companies were doing, and after the Trust's fall, Biograph found itself behind the times. The Biograph Co. released its last new feature-length films in 1915 and its last new short films in 1916. Biograph spent the remainder of the silent era reissuing its old films, and leasing its Bronx studio to other producers.

When the company fell on financial hard times, the Biograph Studio facilities and film laboratory in the Bronx were acquired by one of Biograph Company's creditors, the Empire Trust Company, although some of the ex-Biograph staff were retained to manage the studio and laboratory facilities. Herbert Yates acquired the Biograph Studios facilities and film laboratory in 1928. Biograph Studios facilities and film laboratory were made a subsidiary of his Consolidated Film Industries in 1928. The studio facilities and laboratory burned down in 1980.

In 1939, Iris Barry, founder of the film department at the Museum of Modern Art, acquired 900 cans of film from the Actinograph Corp. Bronx Biograph studio and laboratory facitlies, which was closing its film vault and planning to destroy all the film. One uncompleted film, Lime Kiln Field Day (1913), with an all African American cast, was found among the many cans of film, and shown at MOMA in November 2014.

From 1954 to 1957, Sterling Television Company distributed a package of 100 quarter-hour television shows titled Movie Museum, featuring Biograph, Edison and other early films from the vaults of the Museum of Modern Art and the George Eastman House.

Filmography 
 List of Biograph films released in 1909
 List of Biograph films released in 1910

See also 

 Biograph Studios
 Biograph Theater
 Cinema of the United States
 History of cinema
 List of film formats
 List of Hollywood movie studios

References

External links 

 
 
 The Manic Barber from the Southern Methodist University, Central University Libraries, G. William Jones Film and Video Collection
 Arrival of Emigrants [i.e. Immigrants], Ellis Island by Biograph Company, 1906

 
Articles containing video clips
Film production companies of the United States
1895 establishments in New Jersey